The Funeral of God is the seventh full-length album by metalcore band Zao.  Released on July 13, 2004 through Ferret Records in the US, and on July 12, 2004 through Roadrunner and Ferret in Europe and Asia. It saw the return of guitarist, Russ Cogdell, and the addition of bassist Shawn Koschik and drummer Stephen Peck after the departure of Jesse Smith. A music video was made for the song "The Rising End (The First Prophecy)".

Title note
Originally the album was going to be called, Live... from the Funeral of God, but the band's management was concerned that fans might construe that to mean it's a live recording, so the title was shortened.

Concept
The album is a concept album, narrating an apocalyptic story in which God, fed up with the path chosen by humanity, decides to disappear, leaving humanity to its fate.  Subsequently, the world falls into a state of war and self-destruction.  However, man soon reverts to a state in which he waits for God to return.

Sound
Sounding different from most albums Zao have released, this record is a swing towards bands such as Killswitch Engage and Shadows Fall. It also goes for a more melodic sound than their past albums, such as in the song "Psalm of the City of the Dead".

Track listing

Credits
ZAO
 Dan Weyandt – lead vocals
 Scott Mellinger – guitar, clean vocals
 Russ Cogdell – guitar
 Shawn Koschik – bass, additional engineering
 Stephen Peck – drums

Additional Musicians
 Sara George – additional vocals on track 11
 Josh Momper – piano

Production
 Eric Rachel – producer, engineering, mixing
 Alan Douches – mastering

Artwork
 Don and Ryan Clark (Asterisk Studios) – art direction, design
 Kris McCaddon – logo
 Sarah Fiedler – photography
 Chris Bruno – cover photo

Misc.
 Ryan J. Downey – manager

Quotes
 "The story is unique, the vocals are vicious, the guitars are cacophonic, and the barrage is relentless. Zao has returned with a preeminent fury and have outdone themselves once again." – Outburn (9/10)
 "If the melodic end of the genre has been taken by Killswitch Engage then the extreme end of the Kingdom belongs to Zao. No question." – Metal Hammer UK (9/10)

References

2004 albums
Zao (American band) albums
Ferret Music albums
Roadrunner Records albums
Concept albums